Kostivere is a small borough in Jõelähtme Parish, Harju County in northern Estonia.

References

External links 
Satellite map at Maplandia.com

Boroughs and small boroughs in Estonia
Kreis Harrien